Zync Global Pvt Ltd is an Indian company that offers tablets, phablets, and GSM mobile services in India. Apart from tablet manufacturing, the company is moving into the mobile and accessories manufacturing.

Tablets
Zync launched India's first tablet, the Z-990, to come pre-loaded with Android 4.0 (ice cream sandwich). It has a 7-inch capacitive display (800x480 pixel), 1.2Ghz processor, 1GB RAM and 4GB internal storage (expandable via microSD card). Other specifications include a front VGA camera for video calls, mini-HDMI out, full size USB 2.0 port with host functionality (works with keyboards and 3G USB dongles), mini-USB for data connectivity, Wi-Fi, Bluetooth and GPS. Apart from Z-990, Zync has also launched several other tablets.

References

Manufacturing companies based in Noida
Consumer electronics brands
Electronics companies of India
Indian brands
Mobile phone companies of India
Mobile phone manufacturers
2011 establishments in Delhi
Electronics companies established in 2011
Indian companies established in 2011